Paraquat (trivial name), or N,N′-dimethyl-4,4′-bipyridinium dichloride (systematic name), also known as methyl viologen, is an organic compound with the chemical formula [(C6H7N)2]Cl2. It is classified as a viologen, a family of redox-active heterocycles of similar structure. This salt is one of the most widely used herbicides. It is quick-acting and non-selective, killing green plant tissue on contact. It is also toxic (lethal) to human beings and animals due to its redox activity, which produces superoxide anions. It has been linked to the development of Parkinson's disease and is banned in several countries.

Paraquat may be in the form of salt with chloride or other anions; quantities of the substance are sometimes expressed by cation mass alone (paraquat cation, paraquat ion).

The name is derived from the para positions of the quaternary nitrogens.

Production

Pyridine is coupled by treatment with sodium in ammonia followed by oxidation to give 4,4′-bipyridine. This chemical is then dimethylated with chloromethane to give the final product as the dichloride salt.

Use of other methylating agents gives the bispyridinium with alternate counterions. For example, Hugo Weidel's original synthesis used methyl iodide to produce the diiodide.

Herbicide use
Although first synthesized in 1882, paraquat's herbicidal properties were not recognized until 1955 in the Imperial Chemical Industries (ICI) laboratories at Jealott's Hill. Paraquat was first manufactured and sold by ICI in early 1962 under the trade name Gramoxone, and is today among the most commonly used herbicides.

Paraquat is classified as a non-selective contact herbicide. The key characteristics that distinguish it from other agents used in plant protection products are:

It kills a wide range of annual grasses and broad-leaved weeds and the tips of established perennial weeds.
It is very fast-acting.
It is rain-fast within minutes of application.
It is partially inactivated upon contact with soil.

These properties led to paraquat being used in the development of no-till farming.

The European Union approved the use of paraquat in 2004 but Sweden, supported by Denmark, Austria, and Finland, appealed this decision. In 2007, the court annulled the directive authorizing paraquat as an active plant protection substance stating that the 2004 decision was wrong in finding that there were no indications of neurotoxicity associated with paraquat and that the studies about the link between paraquat and Parkinson's disease should have been considered. Thus, paraquat has been banned in the European Union since 2007.

In the United States, paraquat is available primarily as a solution in various strengths. It is classified as "restricted use", which means that it can be used by licensed applicators only. The estimated use of paraquat in US agriculture is mapped by the US Geological Survey and shows a doubling from 2013 to 2018, the latest date for which figures are available, and now reaching  annually.

There is an ongoing international campaign for a global ban, but the cheap and popular paraquat continues to be unrestricted in most developing countries. A small group of countries, including India and Guatemala and supported by manufacturers, have blocked the listing of paraquat as a hazardous chemical for the purposes of the Rotterdam Convention.

Reactivity and mode of action
Paraquat is an oxidant that interferes with electron transfer, a process that is common to all life.  Addition of one electron gives the radical cation:
 [paraquat]2+  +  e−     [paraquat]•+
The radical cation is also susceptible to further reduction to the neutral [paraquat]0:
 [paraquat]•+  +  e−     [paraquat]0

As an herbicide, paraquat acts by inhibiting photosynthesis. In light-exposed plants, it accepts electrons from photosystem I (more specifically ferredoxin, which is presented with electrons from PS I) and transfers them to molecular oxygen. In this manner, destructive reactive oxygen species (ROS) are produced. In forming these reactive oxygen species, the oxidized form of paraquat is regenerated, and is again available to shunt electrons from photosystem I to restart the cycle. This induces necrosis, and unlike with some mechanisms of necrosis, does not produce double-stranded breaks.

Paraquat is often used in science to catalyze the formation of ROS, more specifically, the superoxide free radical. Paraquat will undergo redox cycling in vivo, being reduced by an electron donor such as NADPH, before being oxidized by an electron receptor such as dioxygen to produce superoxide, a major ROS.

Weed resistance management
Problems with herbicide resistant weeds may be addressed by applying herbicides with different modes of action, along with cultural methods such as crop rotation, in integrated weed management (IWM) systems. Paraquat, with its distinctive mode of action, is one of few chemical options that can be used to prevent and mitigate problems with weeds that have become resistant to the very widely used non-selective herbicide glyphosate.

One example is the "double knock" system used in Australia. Before planting a crop, weeds are sprayed with glyphosate first, then followed seven to ten days later by a paraquat herbicide. Although twice as expensive as using a single glyphosate spray, the "Double Knock" system is widely relied upon by farmers as a resistance management strategy. Nevertheless, herbicide resistance has been seen for both herbicides in Western Australia.

A computer simulation showed that with alternating annual use between glyphosate and paraquat, only one field in five would be expected to have glyphosate-resistant annual ryegrass (Lolium rigidum) after 30 years, compared to nearly 90% of fields sprayed only with glyphosate. A "Double Knock" regime with paraquat cleaning-up after glyphosate was predicted to keep all fields free of glyphosate resistant ryegrass for at least 30 years.

Toxicity
Paraquat is toxic to humans (Category II) by the oral route and moderately toxic (Category III) through the skin. Pure paraquat, when ingested, is highly toxic to mammals, including humans, causing severe inflammation and potentially leading to severe lung damage, acute respiratory distress syndrome (ARDS), and death. The mortality rate is estimated between 60-90%. 

Paraquat is also toxic when inhaled and is in the Toxicity Category I (the highest of four levels) for acute inhalation effects. For agricultural uses, the EPA determined that particles used in agricultural practices (400–800 μm) are not in the respirable range. Paraquat also causes moderate to severe irritation of the eye and skin. Diluted paraquat used for spraying is less toxic; thus, the greatest risk of accidental poisoning is during mixing and loading paraquat for use.

The standard treatment for paraquat poisoning is first to remove as much as possible by pumping the stomach. Fuller's earth or activated charcoal may also improve outcomes depending on the timing. Haemodialysis, haemofiltration, haemoperfusion, or antioxidant therapy may also be suggested. Immunosuppressive therapy to reduce the inflammation is an approach suggested by some, however only low certainty evidence supports using medications such as glucocorticoids with cyclophosphamide in addition to the standard care to reduce mortality. It is also unknown if adding glucocorticoid with cyclophosphamide to the standard care has unwanted side effects such as increasing the risk of infection. Oxygen should not be administered unless SpO2 levels are below 92%, as high concentrations of oxygen intensify the toxic effects.
Death may occur up to 30 days after ingestion. 

Lung injury is a main feature of poisoning. Liver, heart, lung, and kidney failure can occur within several days to weeks that can lead to death up to 30 days after ingestion. Those who suffer large exposures are unlikely to survive. Chronic exposure can lead to lung damage, kidney failure, heart failure, and oesophageal strictures. The mechanism underlying paraquat's toxic damage to humans is still unknown. The severe inflammation is thought to be caused by the generation of highly reactive oxygen species and nitrite species that results in oxidative stress. The oxidative stress may result in mitochondrial toxicity and the induction of apoptosis and lipid peroxidation which may be responsible for the organ damage. it is known that the alveolar epithelial cells of the lung selectively concentrate paraquat. It has been reported that a small dose, even if removed from the stomach or spat out, can still cause death from fibrous tissue developing in the lungs, leading to asphyxiation.

Accidental deaths and suicides from paraquat ingestion are relatively common. For example, there are more than 5,000 deaths in China from paraquat poisoning every year. Long-term exposures to paraquat would most likely cause lung and eye damage, but reproductive/fertility damage was not found by the United States Environmental Protection Agency (EPA) in their review.

"Paraquat pot"
During the late 1970s, a controversial program sponsored by the US government sprayed paraquat on cannabis fields in Mexico. Following Mexican efforts to eradicate marijuana and poppy fields in 1975, the United States government helped by sending helicopters and other technological assistance. Helicopters were used to spray the herbicides paraquat and 2,4-D on the fields; marijuana contaminated with these substances began to show up in US markets, leading to debate about the program. 

Whether any injury came about due to the inhalation of paraquat-contaminated marijuana is uncertain. A 1995 study found that "no lung or other injury in cannabis users has ever been attributed to paraquat contamination". Also a United States Environmental Protection Agency manual states: "... toxic effects caused by this mechanism have been either very rare or nonexistent. Most paraquat that contaminates cannabis is pyrolyzed during smoking to dipyridyl, which is a product of combustion of the leaf material itself (including cannabis) and presents little toxic hazard."

In a study by Imperial Chemical Industries, rats that inhaled paraquat showed development of squamous metaplasia in their respiratory tracts after a couple of weeks. This study was included in a report given to the State Department by the Mitre Corporation. The U.S. Public Health Service stated that "this study should not be used to calculate the safe inhalation dose of paraquat in humans."

Use in suicide and murder
A large majority (93 percent) of fatalities from paraquat poisoning are suicides, which occur mostly in developing countries. For instance, in Samoa from 1979 to 2001, 70 percent of suicides were by paraquat poisoning. Trinidad and Tobago is particularly well known for its incidence of suicides involving the use of Gramoxone (commercial name of paraquat). In southern Trinidad, particularly in Penal, Debe from 1996 to 1997, 76 percent of suicides were by paraquat, 96 percent of which involved the over-consumption of alcohol such as rum. Fashion celebrity Isabella Blow committed suicide using paraquat in 2007. Paraquat is widely used as a suicide agent in third-world countries because it is widely available at low cost. Further, the toxic dose is low (10 mL or 2 teaspoons is enough to kill). Campaigns exist to control or even ban paraquat, and there are moves to restrict its availability by requiring user education and the locking up of paraquat stores. When a 2011 South Korean law completely banned paraquat in the country, death by pesticide plummeted 46%, contributing to the decrease of the overall suicide rate.

The indiscriminate paraquat murders, which occurred in Japan in 1985, were carried out using paraquat as a poison.
Paraquat was used in the UK in 1981 by a woman who poisoned her husband. Steven David Catlin killed two of his wives and his adoptive mother with paraquat between 1976 and 1984.

Parkinson's disease
In 2011, a US National Institutes of Health study showed a link between paraquat use and Parkinson's disease in farm workers. A co-author of the paper said that paraquat increases production of certain oxygen derivatives that may harm cellular structures, and that people who used paraquat, or other pesticides with a similar mechanism of action, were more likely to develop Parkinson's. Paraquat-induced toxicity in rats has also been linked to Parkinson's-like neurological degenerative mechanisms. A study by researchers at the Buck Institute for Research on Aging showed a connection between exposure to paraquat and iron in infancy and mid-life Parkinson's in laboratory mice. A 2013 meta-analysis published in Neurology found that "exposure to paraquat ... was associated with about a 2-fold increase in risk" of Parkinson's disease.

Paraquat is structurally similar to MPP+, a known fast-acting inducer of Parkinson's disease in primate brains. The chloride of MPP+ was sold under the trade name Cyperquat.

Paraquat also induces oxidative stress in invertebrates such as Drosophila melanogaster. Paraquat-fed flies suffer early-onset mortality and significant increases in superoxide dismutase activity.

While in 2022 UK farmers were calling for a ban on the UK production of paraquat, a BBC article stated that "There is no scientific consensus and many conflicting studies on any possible association between Paraquat and Parkinson's"; in the USA a class action lawsuit against Syngenta is ongoing; the company rejects the claims but has paid £187.5 million into a settlement fund.

References

Further reading

External links

 
 

Herbicides
Bipyridines
Avian embryotoxicants
Superoxide generating substances
Nephrotoxins
Pyridinium compounds